Smithfield  is a stop on the Luas light-rail tram system in Dublin, Ireland.  It opened in 2004 as a stop on the Red Line.  The Red Line runs east to west along Phoenix Street, and the Four Courts stop is located to on a section of road closed completely to other traffic, to the side of Smithfield plaza, a large open square previously used as a market.  It also provides access to the Old Jameson Distillery and Light House Cinema.  It has two edge platforms integrated into the pavement.  The stop connects with a number of Dublin Bus routes.

References

Luas Red Line stops in Dublin (city)